Ternstroemia howardiana is a species of plant in the Pentaphylacaceae family. It is endemic to Jamaica.

References

howardiana
Vulnerable plants
Endemic flora of Jamaica
Taxonomy articles created by Polbot